Ardeutica melidora is a species of moth of the family Tortricidae. It is found on Cuba and the British Virgin Islands.

References

Moths described in 1984
Polyorthini
Moths of the Caribbean